William Adams "Wild Bill" Hickman (April 16, 1815 – August 21, 1883) was an American frontiersman. He also served as a representative to the Utah Territorial Legislature.

Latter Day Saint
Hickman was baptized into Church of Jesus Christ of Latter Day Saints in 1839 by John D. Lee. He later served as a personal bodyguard for Joseph Smith and Brigham Young. Hickman was reputedly a member of the Danites.

In April 1854, Hickman was asked by Young to go to Green River and establish a ferry under church ownership. Hickman found the area to be overrun by ferries, along with a growing uneasiness between Mormon ferrymen and mountain men. Hickman was appointed sheriff and county prosecuting attorney, assessor and collector by Judge Appleby in 1854 at Fort Supply, twelve miles south of Fort Bridger. In August 1854, Hickman was elected to the Utah Territorial Legislature for the area of Green River.

On February 8, 1856, Hickman, along with Porter Rockwell, and at the request of Brigham Young, carried the mail from Independence, Missouri, to Salt Lake City. Porter Rockwell carried the mail from Fort Laramie to Salt Lake City, and Hickman from Laramie to Independence. The trip took Hickman nearly four months to complete.

Hickman was an important figure in the Utah War. He torched Fort Bridger and numerous supply trains of the Federal Army.

Beheading of Old Elk
Hickman was part of the militia that carried out genocidal acts against the Timpanogos during the Battle at Fort Utah. They were under orders to kill all the men and take the women and children captive. General Daniel H. Wells had Antonga Black Hawk lead a segment of the militia, including Hickman, up Rock Canyon to attack those who were trying to escape. They found the Timpanogos chief, Old Elk, dead in one of the teepees. According to Hickman, Jim Bridger had offered a $100 reward for Old Elk's head. Hickman chopped off Old Elk's head and brought it back to Fort Utah. There, he hung Old Elk's head by its hair from the walls of the roof. Dr. Blake saw the head, and ordered more heads to be chopped off. Around 50 heads were piled in boxes for two weeks, next to where they kept the prisoners. They were then delivered to Salt Lake City. Some ghost stories have circulated about the victims' ghosts haunting Rock Canyon.

Excommunication and later life
Hickman, a practicing polygamist, was excommunicated from the LDS Church in 1868. Shortly thereafter, nine of his ten wives left him. According to his autobiography, Hickman's excommunication followed after his many attempts to defame Brigham Young and other members of the Church, as well as his many acts of violence and committed murders.

Around September 1871, while under arrest for the murder of Richard Yates years earlier, Hickman wrote an autobiography in which he confessed to having committed numerous murders (possibly 70 or more.) Years later, his autobiography was given to J. H. Beadle, who published it under the sensational title Brigham's Destroying Angel. It's unclear how much of the account is factual and how much is exaggerated, but in his confessions Hickman implicated Brigham Young as being the one who ordered Yates's murder, as well as most of the other murders to which Hickman had confessed. Federal law enforcement authorities at the time gave Hickman enough credence to hold off charging him with any murders so that he could be a material witness in a case they were attempting to build against Young. During this time, Hickman was held at Fort Douglas, where he was guarded by the military, because federal authorities believed Hickman needed witness protection from a perceived threat by the Danites.

Nothing ever became of the case against Young due to lack of evidence. Hickman, who had struck a deal with federal law enforcement to testify against Young if he were ever to be brought to trial, was never convicted of the crimes to which he confessed, although he lived the remainder of his life as somewhat of a pariah, selling pencils for money and living in a shack. All of his wives but the first left him.

Family
Hickman had ten wives. He married his first wife, Bernetta Burchartt on 30 August 1832, second wife was Sarah Elizabeth Luce, married on 30 January 1846. Third wife was Minerva Emma Wade, married on 1 May 1849. Fourth wife was Sarah Basford Meacham, married 18 August 1850. Fifth wife was Hannah Diantha Horr, married 11 September 1853. Sixth wife was recorded only as an "Indian woman" and seventh wife was Sarah Eliza Johnson, married to both women on 28 March 1855. Eighth wife was Mary Lucretia Horr, married in March 1856. Ninth wife was Martha Diana Case Howland, married 2 November 1856, and his tenth wife was Mary Jane Hetherington, married in 21 June 1859. Online genealogical records of the LDS Church show he fathered 36 children. Another source lists 39. Hickman was the grandfather of Mormon metaphysical and inspirational author Annalee Skarin. Hickman was also the grandfather (through Minerva Emma Wade) of the Mormon and Western artist Minerva Teichert. His is also the great-great-grandfather of speculative fiction author Tracy Hickman.

He died in Lander, Wyoming in 1883.

Hickman was re-baptized by proxy into the LDS Church on May 5, 1934.

Legacy
 East Hickman Canyon, Tooele County, Utah
 East Hickman Canyon Road, Tooele County, Utah
 Hickman Canyon, Piute County, Utah
 Hickman Creek, Tooele County, Utah
 Hickman Knolls, Tooele County, Utah
 Hickman Natural Bridge (Arch), Capitol Reef National Park, Wayne County, Utah
 Hickman Pass, Tooele County, Utah
 Hickman Pasture, Wayne County, Utah
 Hickman Spring, Wayne County, Utah
 Indian Hickman Canyon, Tooele, Utah

Works
Brigham's destroying angel : being the life, confession, and startling disclosures of the notorious Bill Hickman, the Danite chief of Utah, Geo A. Crofutt, New York - 1872

References

External links
 Biography from Utah History Encyclopedia
 Bill Hickman page on "Hickman Family" website
 Transcription of Minerva Wade Hickman autobiography, L. Tom Perry Special Collections, Harold B. Lee Library, Brigham Young University

1815 births
1883 deaths
American murderers
Former Latter Day Saints
Converts to Mormonism
Danites
Members of the Utah Territorial Legislature
19th-century American politicians
Mormon pioneers
Mormonism-related controversies
People excommunicated by the Church of Jesus Christ of Latter-day Saints
People of the Utah War